The 432nd Operations Group (432 OG) is an active flying component of the United States Air Force's 432nd Wing, stationed at Creech Air Force Base, Nevada.

The unit employs unmanned aerial vehicles to support operational needs worldwide and deploys assets globally. This includes combat command and control, tactics development, intelligence support, weather support, and standardization and evaluation oversight for units of United States Air Force's Air Combat Command, Air Forces Central, Air Force Materiel Command, Air National Guard, Air Force Reserve Command, as well as remotely puloted aircraft unit of the Royal Air Force. The unit is also responsible for air traffic control, airfield management, and weather services at Creech Air Force Base.

Units
The 432nd Operations Group consists of the following units :
 11th Attack Squadron
 30th Reconnaissance Squadron
 44th Reconnaissance Squadron
 432nd Operations Support Squadron
 489th Attack Squadron

History
The unit was first activated in 1991 as the 432nd Operations Group under the 432nd Fighter Wing. Controlled two squadrons of F-16 Falcon tactical fighters at Misawa AB, Japan, from 1991 to 1994. Unit inactivated along with parent organization when 35th Fighter Wing was assigned to Misawa and 432nd Wing and component organizations were redesignated.

The unit was again reactivated in 2007 when its parent 432nd Wing stood up at Creech AFB, Nevada. The unit has control over several squadrons which operate MQ-9 Reapers. The unit's 30th Reconnaissance Squadron and 44th Reconnaissance Squadron operate the RQ-170 Sentinels.

Lineage
 Established as 432nd Operations Group and activated on 31 May 1991
 Inactivated on 1 October 1994.
 Activated on 1 May 2007

Assignments
 432nd Fighter Wing, 31 May 1991 – 1 October 1994
 432nd Wing, 1 May 2007 – present

Components
 11th Reconnaissance Squadron (later, 11th Attack Squadron), 1 May 2007 – present
 13th Fighter Squadron, 31 May 1991 – 1 October 1994
 14th Fighter Squadron, 31 May 1991 – 1 October 1994
 15th Reconnaissance Squadron (later, 15th Attack Squadron), 1 May 2007 – unknown
 17th Reconnaissance Squadron, 1 May 2007 – 10 September 2012
 18th Reconnaissance Squadron (later, 18th Attack Squadron), 11 December 2009 – unknown
 20th Reconnaissance Squadron (later, 20th Attack Squadron), 1 January 2011 – unknown
 30th Reconnaissance Squadron, 1 May 2007 – 10 September 2012, unknown – present
 39th Rescue Squadron, 1 February 1993 – 1 August 1994
 42nd Attack Squadron, 1 May 2007 – unknown
 44th Reconnaissance Squadron, unknown–present
 50th Attack Squadron, 27 February 2018 – unknown
 89th Attack Squadron, 21 June 2016 – present
 432nd Operations Support Squadron, unknown–present
 489th Attack Squadron, 2 December 2016 – present

Stations
 Misawa AB, Japan, 31 May 1991 – 1 October 1994
 Creech AFB, Nevada, 1 May 2007 – present

Aircraft
 F-16 Falcon (1991–1994)
 HH-60 Pavehawk (1993–1994)
 RQ-1 Predator (later, MQ-1 Predator), (2007–unknown)
 MQ-9 Reaper, (2007–present)
 RQ-170 Sentinel, (2007–2012; unknown–present)

References
Footnotes

Citations

Military units and formations established in 1991
Operations groups of the United States Air Force
1991 establishments in Japan